In Greek mythology the Horae or Horai or Hours ("Seasons") were the goddesses of the seasons and the natural portions of time.

Etymology 
The term horae comes from the Proto-Indo-European  ("year").

Function 

Horae were originally the personifications of nature in its different seasonal aspects, but in later times they were regarded as  goddesses of order in general and natural justice. "They bring and bestow ripeness, they come and go in accordance with the firm law of the periodicities of nature and of life", Karl Kerenyi observed, adding "Hora means 'the correct moment'." Traditionally, they guarded the gates of Olympus, promoted the fertility of the earth, and rallied the stars and constellations. 

The course of the seasons was also symbolically described as the dance of the Horae, and they were accordingly given the attributes of spring flowers, fragrance and graceful freshness; for example, in Hesiod's Works and Days, the fair-haired Horai, together with the Charites and Peitho crown Pandora—she of "all gifts"—with garlands of flowers. Similarly Aphrodite, emerging from the sea and coming ashore at Cyprus, is dressed and adorned by the Horai, and, according to a surviving fragment of the epic Cypria, Aphrodite wore clothing made for her by the Charites and Horai, dyed with spring flowers, such as the Horai themselves wear.

Names and numbers 
The number of Horae varied according to different sources, but was most commonly three: either the trio of Thallo, Auxo and Carpo (goddesses of the order of nature) or Eunomia (goddess of good order and lawful conduct) and her sisters Dike (goddess of Justice) and Eirene (goddess of Peace).

The earlier Argive Horae 
In Argos, two Horae, rather than three, were recognised presumably winter and summer: Auxesia (possibly another name for Auxo) and Damia (possibly another name for Carpo).

In late euhemerist interpretations, they were seen as Cretan maidens who were worshipped as goddesses after they had been wrongfully stoned to death.

The classical Horae triads 
The earliest written mention of Horai is in the Iliad where they appear as keepers of Zeus's cloud gates. "Hardly any traces of that function are found in the subsequent tradition," Karl Galinsky remarked in passing. They were daughters of Zeus and Themis, half-sisters to the Moirai.

The Horai are mentioned in two aspects in Hesiod and the Homeric Hymns:
 in one variant emphasizing their fruitful aspect, Thallo, Auxo, and Carpo—the goddesses of the three seasons the Greeks recognized: spring, summer and autumn—were worshipped primarily amongst rural farmers throughout Greece;
 in the other variant, emphasizing the "right order" aspect of the Horai, Hesiod says that Zeus wedded "bright Themis" who bore Diké, Eunomia, and Eirene, who were law-and-order goddesses that maintained the stability of society; they were worshipped primarily in the cities of Athens, Argos and Olympia.

First triad 
Of the first, more familiar, triad associated with Aphrodite and Zeus is their origins as emblems of times of life, growth (and the classical three seasons of year):
 Thallo (Θαλλώ, literally "The one who brings blossoms"; or Flora for Romans) or Thalatte was the goddess of spring, buds and blooms, a protector of youth.
 Auxo (Αὐξώ. "Increaser" as in plant growth) or Auxesia was worshipped (alongside Hegemone) in Athens as one of their two Charites, Auxo was the Charis of spring and Hegemone was the Charis of autumn. One of the Horae, and the goddess and personification of the season of summer; she is the protector of vegetation and plants, and growth and fertility.
 Carpo (Καρπώ), Carpho or Xarpo (not to be mistaken with Karpos) was the one who brings food (though Robert Graves in The Greek Myths (1955) translates this name as "withering") and was in charge of autumn, ripening, and harvesting, as well as guarding the way to Mount Olympus and letting back the clouds surrounding the mountain if one of the gods left. She was an attendant to Persephone, Aphrodite and Hera, and was also associated with Dionysus, Apollo and Pan.

At Athens, two Horae: Thallo (the Hora of spring) and Carpo (the Hora of autumn), also appear in rites of Attica noted by Pausanias in the 2nd century AD.  Thallo, Auxo and Carpo are often accompanied by Chione, a daughter of Boreas (the god/ personification of the North Wind) and Orithyia/ Oreithyia (originally a mortal princess, who was later deified as a goddess of cold mountain winds), and the goddess/personification of snow and winter. Along with Chione, Thallo, Auxo and Carpo were a part of the entourage of the goddess of the turn of the seasons, Persephone.

Second triad 
Of the second triad associated to Themis and Zeus for law and order:
 Diké (Δίκη, "Justice"; Iustitia for Romans) was the goddess of moral justice: she ruled over human justice, as her mother Themis ruled over divine justice. The anthropomorphisation of Diké as an ever-young woman dwelling in the cities of men was so ancient and strong that in the 3rd century BCE Aratus in Phaenomena 96 asserted that she was born a mortal and that, though Zeus placed her on earth to keep mankind just, he quickly learned this was impossible and placed her next to him on Olympus, as the Greek astronomical/astrological constellation The Maiden.
 Eunomia (Εὐνομία, "Order", governance according to good laws) was the goddess of law and legislation. The same or a different goddess may have been a daughter of Hermes and Aphrodite.
 Eirene or Irene (Εἰρήνη. "Peace"; the Roman equivalent was Pax) was the personification of peace and wealth, and was depicted in art as a beautiful young woman carrying a cornucopia, scepter and a torch or rhyton.

Third triad 
The last triad of Horae was identified by Hyginus:

 Pherusa (Substance, farm estates),
 Euporie or Euporia (Abundance), and
 Orthosie or Orthosia (Prosperity)

The Four Seasons 
Nonnus in his Dionysiaca mentions a distinct set of four Horae, the daughters of Helios. Quintus Smyrnaeus also attributes the Horae as the daughters of Helios and Selene, and describes them as the four handmaidens of Hera. The seasons were personified by the ancients, the Greeks represented them generally as women but on some antique monuments they are depicted as winged children with attributes peculiar to each season. The Greek words for the four seasons of year:

Modern influence 
Nicolas Poussin has represented the four seasons by subjects drawn from the Bible: Spring is portrayed by Adam and Eve in paradise: Summer, by Ruth gleaning: Autumn, by Joshua and Caleb bearing grapes from the promised land; and Winter, by the deluge.

In more modern representations the seasons are often surrounding Apollo: Spring, as Flora, crowned with flowers, and in a shaded green drapery over a white robe: Summer, standing under the lion in the zodiac, with a gold-coloured drapery over a white gauze vestment, the edges of which are tinged by the yellow rays of the sun, holding a sickle, having near her a wheat-sheaf; Autumn, as a Bacchante, in a violet-coloured garment, pressing grapes with one band into a golden cup, which she holds in the other; and Winter as an aged person, placed in the shade at a great distance from the god.

The Hours 

Finally, a quite separate suite of Horae personified the twelve hours (originally only ten), as tutelary goddesses of the times of day. The hours run from just before sunrise to just after sunset, thus winter hours are short, summer hours are long:

The nine Hours 
According to Hyginus, the list is only of nine, borrowed from the three classical triads alternated:

The ten or twelve Hours 

A distinct set of ten or twelve Hours is much less known and they are described as daughters of Chronos (Time):

The twenty-four Hours 
The last set of hours of the day and night is allegorically represented in the following:

Notes

References 

 Hesiod, Theogony from The Homeric Hymns and Homerica with an English Translation by Hugh G. Evelyn-White, Cambridge, MA., Harvard University Press; London, William Heinemann Ltd. 1914. Online version at the Perseus Digital Library. Greek text available from the same website.
 Hesiod, Works and Days from The Homeric Hymns and Homerica with an English Translation by Hugh G. Evelyn-White, Cambridge, MA., Harvard University Press; London, William Heinemann Ltd. 1914. Online version at the Perseus Digital Library. Greek text available from the same website.
 Homer, The Iliad with an English Translation by A.T. Murray, Ph.D. in two volumes. Cambridge, MA., Harvard University Press; London, William Heinemann, Ltd. 1924. Online version at the Perseus Digital Library.
 Homer, Homeri Opera in five volumes. Oxford, Oxford University Press. 1920. Greek text available at the Perseus Digital Library.
 The Homeric Hymns and Homerica with an English Translation by Hugh G. Evelyn-White. Homeric Hymns. Cambridge, MA., Harvard University Press; London, William Heinemann Ltd. 1914. Online version at the Perseus Digital Library. Greek text available from the same website.
 Grimal, Pierre, The Dictionary of Classical Mythology, Wiley-Blackwell, 1996, . "Horae" p. 217
 Nonnus of Panopolis, Dionysiaca translated by William Henry Denham Rouse (1863-1950), from the Loeb Classical Library, Cambridge, MA, Harvard University Press, 1940.  Online version at the Topos Text Project.
 Nonnus of Panopolis, Dionysiaca. 3 Vols. W.H.D. Rouse. Cambridge, MA., Harvard University Press; London, William Heinemann, Ltd. 1940–1942. Greek text available at the Perseus Digital Library.
 Pausanias, Description of Greece with an English Translation by W.H.S. Jones, Litt.D., and H.A. Ormerod, M.A., in 4 Volumes. Cambridge, MA, Harvard University Press; London, William Heinemann Ltd. 1918. Online version at the Perseus Digital Library
 Pausanias, Graeciae Descriptio. 3 vols. Leipzig, Teubner. 1903.  Greek text available at the Perseus Digital Library.
 Quintus Smyrnaeus, The Fall of Troy translated by Way. A. S. Loeb Classical Library Volume 19. London: William Heinemann, 1913. Online version at theio.com
 Quintus Smyrnaeus, The Fall of Troy. Arthur S. Way. London: William Heinemann; New York: G.P. Putnam's Sons. 1913. Greek text available at the Perseus Digital Library.
 Smith, William, Dictionary of Greek and Roman Biography and Mythology, London (1873). "Horae"

External links

 
Children of Zeus
Agricultural goddesses
Food goddesses
Food deities
Greek goddesses
Justice goddesses
Nature goddesses
Peace goddesses
Time and fate goddesses
Seasons
Triple goddesses
Personifications of weather
Personifications in Greek mythology
Children of Helios
Children of Selene
Olympian deities